The LTD LO-120 is a German ultralight aircraft, produced by Logistik-Technik, of Baindt and based on the earlier LO 120 S produced by LO-Fluggerrätebau. The aircraft is supplied as a kit for amateur construction or as a complete ready-to-fly-aircraft.

Design and development
The LO-120 was designed to comply with the Fédération Aéronautique Internationale microlight rules. It features a cantilever high-wing, a two-seats-in-tandem open cockpit with a small windshield, fixed tricycle landing gear and a single engine in pusher configuration.

The aircraft is made from wood, with its flying surfaces covered in doped aircraft fabric. The tail is an inverted V-tail mounted to twin booms. The standard engine is the  Rotax 447 two-stroke powerplant.

Cockpit access is via a sliding fairing.

Specifications (LO-120S)

References

2000s German ultralight aircraft
Homebuilt aircraft
Single-engined pusher aircraft
High-wing aircraft